Ludovico Vico (11 February 1952 – 8 September 2021) was an Italian politician.

Biography
Vico was born in Taranto on 11 February 1952 and later lived in Matera. He first became a member of the Italian Communist Party before joining the Democratic Party of the Left. There, he joined The Olive Tree coalition. He was re-elected in 2008 as a member of the Democratic Party. He finished second in 2013 and left the Chamber.

Vico returned to the Chamber of Deputies on 15 March 2015 following the resignation of Massimo Bray. They sought refuge in a vehicle, which was then kicked and punched by the protesters.

Ludovico Vico died in Manduria on 8 September 2021 at the age of 69.

References

1952 births
2021 deaths
People from Taranto
20th-century Italian politicians
21st-century Italian politicians
Deputies of Legislature XV of Italy
Deputies of Legislature XVI of Italy
Deputies of Legislature XVII of Italy
Italian Communist Party politicians
Democratic Party of the Left politicians
Democrats of the Left politicians
Democratic Party (Italy) politicians